Ewandro Felipe de Lima Costa (born 15 March 1996), known as Ewandro, is a Brazilian professional footballer who plays for Bulgarian First League club Spartak Varna, on loan from Lokomotiv Plovdiv, as a winger.

Club career

São Paulo
Ewandro joined São Paulo in 2009. On 23 January 2014, he made his debut in a 4–0 victory against Mogi Mirim in a Campeonato Paulista tie, in which he replaced Luís Fabiano with six minutes remaining. A week later, Ewandro scored his first São Paulo goal in a 6–3 victory over Rio Claro, netting in the 81st minute with his first touch of the ball.

Atlético Paranaense (loan)
On 21 July 2015, Ewandro joined league rivals Atlético Paranaense on loan for the remainder of the 2015 season and the 2016 season. On 23 August 2015, Ewandro made his Atlético Paranaense debut in a 2–0 defeat against Internacional, in which he replaced Douglas Coutinho for the remaining twenty minutes. Ewandro scored his first Atlético Paranaense goal on 30 August 2015, in a 3–0 victory over Goiás.

On 1 May 2016, Ewandro scored his first goal of the 2016 campaign in a 3–0 victory against Coritiba, netting in the 65th minute to make it 2–0. Ewandro went on to make nineteen more appearances and score two more goals in all competitions over the 2016 campaign before joining Italian side Udinese.

Udinese
On 7 July 2016, Ewandro joined Serie A side Udinese on a five-year deal.

On 21 January 2018, Ewandro was loaned to Portuguese Primeira Liga side Estoril for the remainder of the season.

On 6 August 2018, Ewandro joined to Austrian Bundesliga side Austria Wien on loan.

In April 2019, he joined Fluminense on loan until the end of the season.

On 17 December 2019, Brazilian club Sport announced that Ewandro will join them on loan until 31 December 2020.

Career statistics

Honours
Atlético Paranaense
 Campeonato Paranaense: 2016

Náutico
 Campeonato Pernambucano: 2022

References

1996 births
Living people
Brazilian footballers
Brazilian expatriate footballers
Campeonato Brasileiro Série A players
Serie A players
Primeira Liga players
Austrian Football Bundesliga players
São Paulo FC players
Club Athletico Paranaense players
Udinese Calcio players
G.D. Estoril Praia players
FK Austria Wien players
Fluminense FC players
Sport Club do Recife players
PFC Lokomotiv Plovdiv players
PFC Spartak Varna players
Brazil under-20 international footballers
Brazil youth international footballers
Expatriate footballers in Italy
Brazilian expatriate sportspeople in Italy
Expatriate footballers in Portugal
Brazilian expatriate sportspeople in Portugal
Association football forwards
Sportspeople from Recife